This is a list of episodes of the longest-running South Korean cooking show The Best Cooking Secrets in 2020. The show airs on weekdays on EBS 1TV. The 2020 season is hosted by Leeteuk.

Episodes

Release
Due to COVID-19 outbreak, episodes from 30 March until 10 April 2020 were cancelled to make way for special program Conquering COVID-19 special live broadcast - EBS is here. The awareness program was aired daily from 9:30am to 1:50pm for two weeks. The Best Cooking Secrets resumed its airing on 13 April 2020.

References

Best Cooking Secrets
2020 in South Korean television
Lists of cooking series episodes